The Villa Belvoir respectively the Belvoirpark is a Cultural Heritage in Zürich-Enge that comprises the mansion built between 1828 and 1831, and one of the largest public parks and arboreta in the city of Zürich in Switzerland.

Location 
Lydia Escher's (1858–1891) grandfather Heinrich Escher (1776–1853) had built the country house Belvoir, situated on the left shore of Zürichsee in the then village of Enge, as of today being a district of the city of Zürich. The area houses the Hotelfachschule Belvoirpark and is one of the largest public parks in Zürich. Public transport is provided by the Zürich Tram route 7 and by the bus lines 161 and 165.

History 
Heinrich Escher bought in 1826 the so-called «Wyssbühel», a vine-covered hill on Zürichsee lakeshore. According to his own plans, the top of the hill was removed and the material used for populations on the swampy banks. The area was planted with exotic trees, which partly came from Northern America. The High Neoclassical mansion in the centre of the complex was built between 1828 and 1831. Heinrich Escher, Lydia Zolliker and their children Clementina and Alfred Escher (1819–1882) were the first inhabitants, establishing the Escher's family tradition to Alred's daughter Lydia Escher to 1890. In addition to his scientific collections and studies, Heinrich Escher dedicated himself especially the design and maintenance of his estate, which he called Belvoir (beautiful view in French).

On occasion of the construction of the so-called linksufrige Seeuferbahn (literally: left lakeside railway) in 1872, the spacious estate lost the direct access to the lake. Alfred Escher died in 1882, and he inherited the estate to his daughter Lydia; after her suicide in 1891, the estate was the base to establish the Gottfried Keller Foundation and was bequeathed to the Swiss Confederation (Eidgenossenschaft). The Federal Council acted as the administrator of the foundation, and planned to sell the estate, to meet Lydia Escher's conditions attached to the gift. When this became known, prominent Zürich citizens formed a committee to save the park for the public use. As the city government was unable to raise the money to buy the estarte, the city's population bought shares for the rescue of the park, and within some days the required capital was provided. To finance the maintenance, the Belvoirpark-society (Belvoirpark-Gesellschaft) sold along the Seestrasse road some building plots. In 1901 the city of Zürich was able to take over the property, and thanked its citizens to have prevent the appalling loss of unsheathed. The villa was rebuilt in 1925 to host the then Hotel- und Wirtefachschule mit Restaurantbetrieb Belvoir. As of today, the villa also is used by the Wollishofen guild, but it primarily houses the restaurant Belvoir Park which is operated by the students of the hotel management school Belvoirpark Hotelfachschule.

Belvoirpark 
The Belvoirpark is one of Zürich's earliest landscape gardens and attracted much admiration on the occasion of its opening. At that time, both its location with magnificent views of the city, the lake and the mountains, as well the varied and exciting terrain design and the present, exceptionally crafted arboretum, attracted. In 1881, a double row of Populus trees marked the access to the villa, which led to the greenhouse and the stables. On the highest point of the area, the villa is situated, nestled in large groups of trees. The parterre of flowers with Banana palms, fountain and carpet beds extends in the southeasterly direction. At its southern end, at the edge of the artificially flattened hilltop, lake and mountains can be seen. A large vegetable garden completes the park in the southwestern corner with the economics building.

The childhood friend of Lydia Escher's husband, Karl Stauffer-Bern, was allowed to set up a studio in the greenhouse of the Belvoirpark in 1886. In 1889 Stauffer initiated the idea, to re-design the park after Italian landscapes and architecture. When the work was nearly completed, the family planned to move to Italy, and Lydia and her husband traveled to Florence, where they were looking for a new property with the help of Stauffer. Among the various specimens, there are Acer buergeranum, Magnolia × soulangeana, Rhododendron, Ginkgo biloba, Carya, Campsis radicans, Abies cephalonica, Abies pinsapo and Podocarpus chinensis. In 1895, a project was implemented by Evariste Mertens comprising a Baroque jewelry investment with lawn tennis courts and a generous croquet square.

Fourteen years later a heated pond to the presentation of tropical aquatic plants was installed, being a reminiscent of the jungle-like structures of the Brissago Islands. The border and scenic shore planting mark the transition into the native flora with subtropical and some flowering plants. The transformation of the flower terrace was done in 1923. A larger well should be built, and Hermann Haller created a bronze sculpture on the base of the old fountain. In 1933, the largest rebuilt of the park took place with the extension of the Alfred-Escher-Strasse to Wollishofen, therefore in the north an area of 1,500 square meters and in the south around 2,100 square meters went lost. The Chestnut as well as the Elm trees had been cut without substitution, the tennis courts disappeared, and a new entrance was built. Only the lakeside entrance to the Park still corresponds to the park borders around 1830.   

The Schneeligut area integrated on occasion of the 1939 Swiss national exhibition, and the grotto of Karl Stauffer had to be replaced. On occasion of the G59 exhibition, the central puplic square in the garden was rebuilt, and the free-standing wall with the Pergola at the lily pool and the Iridae gardens establisblished. In 1985, the garden area with the Irideae, the so-called Irisgarten, was redesigned by Walter Frischknecht. About 120 different types of Iridae bloom from March (miniature Iris) until July (Iris barbata), and there grow, among many others, Iris pseudacorus and Peony.

Cultural heritage of national importance 
The area of the park and the mansion and assiciotaed buildings are listed in the Swiss inventory of cultural property of national and regional significance as a Class A object of national importance. The associated buildings, the former stables and the greenhouse, are not publicly accessible.

Literature 
 Gartenbiografien: Orte erzählen. vdf Hochschulverlag AG, ETH Zürich, Zürich 2013, .

References

External links 

  Grün Stadt Zürich 
 Belvoirpark Hotelfachschule 

Restaurants in Zürich
Education in Zürich
Parks in Zürich
Tourist attractions in Zürich
Cultural property of national significance in the canton of Zürich
Parks in Switzerland
Arboreta
Houses completed in 1831
1901 establishments in Switzerland
19th-century architecture in Switzerland